The 2016–17 season was Bristol City's 119th season as a professional football club and their second consecutive season back in the Championship. Along with competing in the Championship, the club also participated in the FA Cup and League Cup. The season covers the period from 1 July 2016 to 30 June 2017.

First-Team Squad

Statistics

|-
|colspan=14|Player(s) out on loan:

|-
|colspan=14|Player(s) who left the club during the season:

|}

Goals

Disciplinary Record

Contracts

Transfers

In

Income  – Undisclosed (£10,395,000+)

Out

 Expenditure  – Undisclosed (£12,000,000)

Loans In

Loans out

Competitions

Pre-season friendlies

EFL Championship

League table

Results summary

Results by matchday

Matches

FA Cup

League Cup

Summary

Score overview

References

Bristol City
Bristol City F.C. seasons